Roberval can refer to:

People
 Gilles de Roberval, French mathematician and scientist
 Jean-François de la Roque de Roberval, lieutenant-general of New France (1541–1543)

Places
 Roberval, Quebec
 Roberval (provincial electoral district), a provincial electoral district in Quebec
 Roberval (electoral district), a Canadian federal electoral district
 Roberval, Oise, a commune in the Oise département, in northern France

Other
 Académie de Roberval, a French high school in Montreal, Quebec
 Roberval Balance, a type of weighing scale